Winneboujou is an unincorporated community, located in the town of Brule, Douglas County, Wisconsin, United States.

The community is located 3 miles east of Lake Nebagamon; and 33 miles east-southeast of the city of Superior.

Winneboujou is located at the junction of Wisconsin Highway 27 and County Road B.

The community is named after Winneboujou, a character from the Ojibwa traditional stories.

References

Unincorporated communities in Douglas County, Wisconsin
Unincorporated communities in Wisconsin